Donna Burns OAM is an Australian intellectual disability basketball player who won gold as a member of the Pearls in the 1992 Madrid Paralympic Games for Persons with Mental Handicap. Burns is an Indigenous Australian and descendant of the Yorta Yorta.

Personal
Burns is an Australian basketball player who won gold as a member of the Pearls in the 1992 Madrid Paralympic Games for Persons with Mental Handicap. Born in 1972 in Echuca, Victoria, Australia, Burns is an Indigenous Australian and descendant of the Yorta Yorta. She is the granddaughter of Margaret Tucker, an Indigenous Australian activist and writer.

Basketball career

Burns alternated from playing netball to basketball from the age of eight. As a teenager she focussed on basketball at the encouragement of her coach, who saw her potential to represent Australia.

Burns was selected as a member of the Pearls, the Australian national women's basketball team for athletes with an intellectual disability. The Pearls were undefeated in Madrid in their five games, against Great Britain, France, Poland and Greece. Burns scored 128 of the team's 273 total points, and was voted Most Valuable Player.

Recognition
 NAIDOC Victorian Sports Person of the Year 1993
 1993 National Sportswoman of the Year at the 4th biennial National Aboriginal and Torres Strait Islander Sports Awards
 Awarded Medal of the Order of Australia (OAM) on 13 June 1993 in "recognition of service to sport as a gold medalist at the Paralympic Games, Madrid 1992" 
 Inducted to Aboriginal and Islander Sports Hall of Fame

References

Living people
Indigenous Australian Paralympians
Recipients of the Medal of the Order of Australia
Sportswomen from Victoria (Australia)
Intellectual Disability category Paralympic competitors
People from Echuca
Australian women's basketball players
Year of birth missing (living people)
Sportspeople with intellectual disability